The Kansa method is a  computer method used to solve partial differential equations. Its main advantage is it is very easy to understand and program on a computer. It is much less complicated than the finite element
method. Another advantage is it works well on multi variable problems. The finite element method is complicated when working with more than 3 space variables and time.

The Kansa Method can be explained by an analogy to a basketball court with many light bulbs suspended all across the ceiling. You solve for the brightness of each bulb so that the desired light intensity directly on the floor of the basketball court under each bulb solves the differential equation at that point. So if the basketball court has 100 bulbs suspended over it; the light intensity at any point on the floor of the basketball court
approaches  a  light intensity that approximately solves the differential equation at any location on the floor of the basketball court. A simple computer program can solve by iteration for the brightness of each bulb, which makes this method easy to program. This method does not need weighted residuals (Galerkin), integration, or advanced mathematics.

E. J. Kansa in very early 1990s made the first attempt to extend radial basis function (RBF), which was then quite popular in scattered data processing and function approximation, to the solution of partial differential equations in the strong-form collocation formulation. His RBF collocation approach is inherently meshless, easy-to-program, and mathematically very simple to learn. Before long, this method became known as the Kansa method in the academic community.

Because the RBF uses the one-dimensional Euclidean distance variable irrespective of dimensionality, the Kansa method is independent of dimensionality and geometric complexity of problems of interest. The method is a domain-type numerical technique in the sense that the problem is discretized not only on the boundary to satisfy boundary conditions but also inside domain to satisfy governing equation.

In contrast, there is another type of RBF numerical methods, called boundary-type RBF collocation method, such as the method of fundamental solution, boundary knot method, singular boundary method, boundary particle method, and regularized meshless method, in which the basis functions, also known as kernel function, satisfy the governing equation and are often fundamental solution or general solution of governing equation. Consequently, only boundary discretization is required.

Since the RBF in the Kansa method does not necessarily satisfy the governing equation, one has more freedom to choose a RBF. The most popular RBF in the Kansa method is the multiquadric (MQ), which usually shows spectral accuracy if an appropriate shape parameter is chosen.

Description 

The Kansa method, also called modified MQ scheme or MQ collocation method, originated from the well-known MQ interpolation. The efficiency and applicability of this method have been verified in a wide range of problems. Compared with the boundary-type RBF collocation methods, the Kansa method has wider applicability to problems whose fundamental and general solutions are not available, e.g., varying coefficient and nonlinear problems.

Formulation 

Let d-dimensional physical domain  and consider the following boundary value problem (BVP) 
 

The Kansa method approximates the desired function by a linear combination of the RBF in the form:

 

where  is the coefficients to be determined,  denotes the RBF such as the MQ.

In order to guarantee the uniqueness of the solution, a polynomial term may be added as follows:

 

where   is the polynomial. The RBF interpolation (4) and (5) are both often used in practice. Mathematicians prefer the latter for its rigorous and solid theoretical foundation, while engineering users often employ the former since it is easier and simpler and produces the sound results in the majority of cases.  
Substituting Eq. (4) or (5) into Eqs. (1–3) yields the resulting algebraic equation system:

 
  
where   
 
After expansion coefficients   are evaluated, the desired function can be calculated from Eq. (4) or (5).

History and recent developments 

Numerical solutions of PDEs are usually obtained through the finite difference method (FDM), the finite element method (FEM) or boundary element method (BEM). It is known that the FDM is difficult to model an irregular domain for the reason that it usually requires a rectangular grid system. Although the FEM can accommodate a more flexible framework, the meshing and remeshing are not trivial. The BEM is an alternative method in some engineering problems, such as inverse, unbounded domain, and thin-walled structure problems. However, its applications are largely limited by the availability of the fundamental solution of the governing equation.

In the recent several decades, “meshless” or “element-free” methods attract great attention. The driving force behind the scene is that the mesh-based methods such as the standard FEM and BEM require prohibitively computational effort in handling high-dimensional, moving, and complex-shaped boundary problems. The Kansa method  directly collocates the RBFs, especially the MQ, at the nodes without the need of mesh or elements and therefore is an inherently truly meshless method.

Despite great effort, the rigorous mathematical proof of the solvability of the Kansa method is still missing. In addition, the mixed boundary conditions also destroy the symmetry of its interpolation matrix. Refs. propose the symmetric Hermite RBF collocation scheme with sound mathematical analysis of solvability. One common issue in the Kansa method and symmetric Hermite method, however, is that the numerical solutions at nodes adjacent to boundary deteriorate by one to two orders of magnitude compared with those in central region. The PDE collocation on the boundary (PDECB)  effectively remove this shortcoming. However, this strategy requires an additional set of nodes inside or outside of the domain adjacent to the boundary. The arbitrary placing of these additional nodes gives rise to troublesome issues in the simulation of complex and multiply-connected domain problems. The PDECB also lacks explicit theoretical endorsement. In fact, a similar strategy has also been proposed, which collocates both governing and boundary equations on the same boundary nodes. However, the method is unsymmetrical and still lacks explicit theoretical foundation. By using the Green second identity, the modified Kansa method  is devised to remedy all weaknesses aforementioned.   For the MQ, its shape parameter largely determines its interpolation error. There exist a number of mathematical theories concerning the family of multiquadric radial basis functions and providing some suggestions on the choice of the shape parameter.

The Kansa method are widely been applied in computational sciences. In, the Kansa method is employed to address the parabolic, hyperbolic and elliptic partial differential equations. Kansa method has recently been extended to various ordinary and PDEs including the bi-phasic and triphasic mixture models of tissue engineering problems, 1D nonlinear Burger's equation with shock wave, shallow water equations  for tide and current simulation, heat transfer problems, free boundary problems, and fractional diffusion equations.

See also 
 Radial basis function
 Method of fundamental solutions
 Boundary knot method
 Boundary particle method
 Singular boundary method

External links 
 Modified Kansa method

References 

Partial differential equations